Siler is an unincorporated community in Whitley County, Kentucky, United States. Siler has a post office with ZIP code 40763, which opened on October 5, 1904.

References

Unincorporated communities in Whitley County, Kentucky
Unincorporated communities in Kentucky